The Anglican Bishop of Nottingham was an episcopal title used by a Church of England suffragan bishop. The title took its name after the county town of Nottingham and was first created under the Suffragan Bishops Act 1534. Until 1837, Nottingham had been part of the Diocese of York, when it then became part of the Diocese of Lincoln. With the creation of the Diocese of Southwell in 1884, Nottingham became part of that diocese, but the then- (and final) bishop remained suffragan to Lincoln. Since 2005, Nottingham gives its name to the Diocese of Southwell and Nottingham.

List of suffragan bishops

See also
Archdeacon of Nottingham

References

External links
 Crockford's Clerical Directory - Listings

Anglican suffragan bishops in the Diocese of York
Anglican suffragan bishops in the Diocese of Lincoln
Anglican suffragan bishops in the Diocese of Southwell and Nottingham
1534 establishments in England